The 1984–85 season was the 76th year of football played by Dundee United, and covers the period from 1 July 1984 to 30 June 1985. United finished in third place, securing UEFA Cup football for the following season.

Match results
Dundee United played a total of 55 competitive matches during the 1984–85 season. The team finished third in the Scottish Premier Division.

In the cup competitions, United lost in the final of both the Scottish Cup and the Skol Cup to Celtic and Rangers respectively. Manchester United eliminated United in the third round of the UEFA Cup.

Legend

All results are written with Dundee United's score first.

Premier Division

Scottish Cup

Skol Cup

UEFA Cup

League table

References

See also
 1984–85 in Scottish football

Dundee United F.C. seasons
Dundee United